The R579 is a Regional Route in South Africa.

Route
Its northern origin is the R37 at the southern end of Chuenespoort pass. It heads south to intersect the R518 at Lebowakgomo. It heads south-south-east through the town Jane Furse, the route then becoming more southerly to end at the R33 near Stoffberg.

References

Regional Routes in Limpopo